This is a list of states and union territories of India ranked according to poverty as of 2022 (2021-22) as hosted by NITI Aayog's Sustainable Development Goals dashboard; and Reserve Bank of India's 'Handbook of Statistics on Indian Economy'. The rank is calculated according to the percentage of people below poverty -line which is computed as per Tendulkar method on Mixed Reference Period (MRP).

List

Supporting content

References

Further reading 

 

Poverty rate
States and union territories
Poverty rate
Lists of subdivisions of India
India, poverty rate